Silver Springs is a village in Wyoming County, New York, United States. The population was 782 at the 2010 census.

The Village of Silver Springs is within the Town of Gainesville, and is located on Route 19A.

Silver Springs is home to the world's largest collection of Beavis and Butt-Head memorabilia.

History 

The Village of Silver Springs was  incorporated in 1895 and had formerly been East Gainesville.

Silver Springs is located at  (42.658791, -78.084875).

Demographics

As of the census of 2000, there were 844 people, 341 households, and 221 families residing in the village. The population density was 892.2 people per square mile (343.0/km2). There were 370 housing units at an average density of 391.1 per square mile (150.4/km2). The racial makeup of the village was 98.10% White, 0.24% African American, 0.47% Native American, 0.12% Asian, and 1.07% from two or more races. Hispanic or Latino of any race were 0.95% of the population.

There were 341 households, out of which 31.7% had children under the age of 18 living with them, 49.3% were married couples living together, 10.9% had a female householder with no husband present, and 34.9% were non-families. 29.3% of all households were made up of individuals, and 15.0% had someone living alone who was 65 years of age or older. The average household size was 2.46 and the average family size was 3.02.

In the village, the population was spread out, with 23.8% under the age of 18, 7.2% from 18 to 24, 31.0% from 25 to 44, 23.6% from 45 to 64, and 14.3% who were 65 years of age or older. The median age was 38 years. For every 100 females, there were 89.7 males. For every 100 females age 18 and over, there were 84.8 males?

The median income for a household in the village was $34,338, and the median income for a family was $43,750. Males had a median income of $31,842 versus $22,557 for females. The per capita income for the village was $15,993. About 6.1% of families and 8.3% of the population were below the poverty line, including 7.7% of those under age 18 and 7.9% of those age 65 or over.

Public school 
Letchworth High School

References

External links

Villages in New York (state)
Villages in Wyoming County, New York